The Amsterdam Rugmakers were a Canadian–American League baseball team based in Amsterdam, New York, USA, that played from 1938 to 1942 and from 1946 to 1951. They played their home games at Mohawk Mills Park (now Shuttleworth Park) and were affiliated with the New York Yankees during their entire existence.

The team won one league championship, in 1940 under manager Eddie Sawyer.

Vic Raschi, Lew Burdette, Spec Shea, Gus Triandos, John Blanchard, Joe Collins, Karl Drews, Bob Grim, Torbert MacDonald, and Daffin Backstrom all played for the Rugmakers.

References

Baseball teams established in 1938
1938 establishments in New York (state)
Defunct minor league baseball teams
Defunct baseball teams in New York (state)
1951 disestablishments in New York (state)
Baseball teams disestablished in 1951
New York Yankees minor league affiliates